The 2020 SaarLorLux Open was a badminton tournament which took place at Saarlandhalle in Saarbrücken, Germany, from 27 October to 1 November 2020 and had a total prize of $90,000.

Tournament
The 2020 SaarLorLux Open was the only Super 100 tournament of the 2020 BWF World Tour and also part of the SaarLorLux Open championships, which had been held since 1988. This tournament was organized by German Badminton Association and sanctioned by the BWF.

Venue
This international tournament was held at Saarlandhalle in Saarbrücken, Saarland, Germany.

Point distribution
Below is the point distribution table for each phase of the tournament based on the BWF points system for the BWF Tour Super 100 event.

Prize money
The total prize money for this tournament was US$90,000. Distribution of prize money was in accordance with BWF regulations.

Men's singles

Seeds

 Rasmus Gemke (third round)
 Lakshya Sen (withdrew)
 Mark Caljouw (final) 
 Brice Leverdez (third round)
 Hans-Kristian Vittinghus (second round)
 Subhankar Dey (withdrew)
 Pablo Abián (third round)
 Toby Penty (third round)

Finals

Top half

Section 1

Section 2

Bottom half

Section 3

Section 4

Women's singles

Seeds

 Carolina Marín (semi-finals)
 Mia Blichfeldt (withdrew)
 Kirsty Gilmour (champion)
 Line Kjærsfeldt (semi-finals)
 Qi Xuefei (quarter-finals)
 Yvonne Li (final)
 Lianne Tan (quarter-finals) 
 Julie Dawall Jakobsen (quarter-finals)

Finals

Top half

Section 1

Section 2

Bottom half

Section 3

Section 4

Men's doubles

Seeds

 Kim Astrup / Anders Skaarup Rasmussen (withdrew)
 Mark Lamsfuß / Marvin Emil Seidel (first round)
 Ben Lane / Sean Vendy (withdrew)
 Alexander Dunn / Adam Hall (quarter-finals)
 Jones Ralfy Jansen / Peter Käsbauer (semi-finals)
 Christopher Grimley / Matthew Grimley (first round)
 Eloi Adam / Julien Maio (quarter-finals)
 Daniel Lundgaard / Mathias Thyrri (final)

Finals

Top half

Section 1

Section 2

Bottom half

Section 3

Section 4

Women's doubles

Seeds

 Gabriela Stoeva / Stefani Stoeva (champions)
 Maiken Fruergaard / Sara Thygesen (semi-finals)
 Émilie Lefel / Anne Tran (quarter-finals)
 Linda Efler / Isabel Herttrich (quarter-finals)
 Alexandra Bøje / Mette Poulsen (quarter-finals)
 Amalie Magelund / Freja Ravn (final)
 Jenny Moore / Victoria Willliams (withdrew)
 Debora Jille / Cheryl Seinen (semi-finals)

Finals

Top half

Section 1

Section 2

Bottom half

Section 3

Section 4

Mixed doubles

Seeds

 Thom Gicquel / Delphine Delrue (withdrew)
 Robin Tabeling / Selena Piek (semi-finals)
 Mark Lamsfuß / Isabel Herttrich (final)
 Mathias Christiansen / Alexandra Bøje (champions)
 Ronan Labar / Anne Tran (semi-finals)
 Adam Hall / Julie MacPherson (second round)
 Mathias Thyrri / Mai Surrow (withdrew)
 Bjarne Geiss / Linda Efler (quarter-finals)

Finals

Top half

Section 1

Section 2

Bottom half

Section 3

Section 4

References

External link
 Tournament Link

SaarLorLux Open
SaarLorLux Open
SaarLorLux Open
SaarLorLux Open
SaarLorLux Open